Lums Pond State Park is a  Delaware state park near Bear, New Castle County, Delaware in the United States. The park surrounds Lums Pond, an impoundment built by the Chesapeake and Delaware Canal on St. Georges Creek. The C&D built the pond as a source of water to fill the locks of the canal that connected the Chesapeake Bay with the Delaware River during the early 19th century. Lums Pond State Park is open for a wide variety of year-round recreation.

History
Lums Pond, the largest freshwater pond in Delaware, covering  in central New Castle County, was built in the early 19th century as an impoundment for the Chesapeake and Delaware Canal. The pond supplied water to fill the locks of the canal and water power for a local gristmill. The pond became a natural recreational draw for the residents of Delaware. Ownership was transferred to the state of Delaware in the mid-20th century. Lums Pond State Park was opened to the public in 1963.

The Lum's Mill House was added to the National Register of Historic Places in 1973.

Recreation
Lums Pond is the center of recreation at Lums Pond State Park. Although swimming is not permitted in the pond, it is open to boating and fishing. Rowboats, sailboats, kayaks, canoes, and pedalos are available to rent. Lums Pond is a freshwater fishery with the common game fish being carp, pickerel, crappie, catfish, and largemouth bass and hybrid striped bass. The hybrid striped bass are stocked by the Fish and Wildlife Division of the Delaware Department of Natural Resources and Environmental Control. The other game fish are native species.

Many visitors to Lums Pond State Park take advantage of the wide variety of camping opportunities that are available. There 62 campsites without electric connections, six sites with electricity, two yurts, and four sites with stabling facilities for horses. The campsites are open to RVs or tents. The yurts feature bunk beds and a futon, electricity, and a large outdoor deck with freshwater and a grill. The Whale Wallow Nature Center is open seasonally.

Lums Pond State Park is open to hiking, cross-country skiing 
 on the park's network of trails. Summit North Marina is located on the Chesapeake and Delaware Canal. It has 250 private slips for boats and offers boat and fuel sales, boat storage and boat repair. Many different ballfields and game courts are spread throughout Lums Pond State Park. The fields are open to football, cricket, soccer, baseball, and softball. The courts are open to basketball, volleyball and tennis. Horseshoes pits are available as is a disc golf course. Hunting is permitted with a hunting license from the Division of Fish and Wildlife but a special permit from the Division of Parks and Recreation is also required since the park is Parks and Recreation property. The special permit can be acquired at the park office.

In June 2013, a Go Ape tree-top adventure course was added to the park.

Nearby state parks
The following state parks are within  of Lums Pond State Park:
Alapocas Run State Park (New Castle County)
Auburn Valley State Park (New Castle County)
Bellevue State Park (New Castle County)
Brandywine Creek State Park (New Castle County)
Elk Neck State Park (Maryland)
Fort Delaware State Park (New Castle County)
Fort DuPont State Park (New Castle County)
Fort Mott State Park (New Jersey)
Fox Point State Park (New Castle County)
First State Heritage Park at Dover (Kent County)
Parvin State Park (New Jersey) 
Ridley Creek State Park (Pennsylvania)
Susquehanna State Park (Maryland)
Wilmington State Parks  (New Castle County)
White Clay Creek Preserve (Pennsylvania)
White Clay Creek State Park (New Castle County)

References

External links
Lums Pond State Park

State parks of Delaware
Parks in New Castle County, Delaware
Protected areas established in 1963
Bodies of water in New Castle County, Delaware
Ponds of Delaware
1963 establishments in Delaware
Chesapeake & Delaware Canal